The 2009–10 Eredivisie Vrouwen was the third season of the Netherlands women's professional football league. The league took place from 1 October 2009 to 19 May 2010 with six teams. AZ successfully defended the title and became champions for a third year running. The 60 matches of the season had a 22,140 total attendance.

Teams

On 5 May 2009, financial problems forced Roda JC to announce its withdraw from the league. Six teams played in the season.

Source: Soccerway

Format
The season was played in a quadruple round-robin format, where all six participating teams played each other four times (twice away and twice at home), a total of 20 matches each. The champion qualified to the UEFA Women's Champions League. There was no relegation system in place.

Standings

Results

Season's first half

Season's second half

Top scorers

Source: vrouwenvoetbalnederland.nl

References

External links
Official website
Season on soccerway.com

Nether
1
2009